Kanneboina Srinivasa Rao Yadav, known professionally as Vandemataram Srinivas, is an Indian music director and playback singer who works predominantly in Telugu cinema. He has won two Filmfare Awards and six Nandi Awards. He got the prefix "Vandemataram" from the title song of the film Vande Mataram (1985).

Early life 
Vandemataram Srinivas was born as Kanneboina Srinivasa Rao. He was born in a Ramakrishnapuram village in Khammam district of present-day Telangana (then in Andhra Pradesh), India.

Awards
Filmfare Awards:
 Filmfare Award for Best Music Director - Telugu - Osey Ramulamma (1997) 
 Filmfare Award for Best Male Playback Singer – Telugu for  Aahaa..! (1998)

Nandi Awards
 Best Music Director :Osey Ramulamma(1997)
 Best Music Director :Swayamvaram (1999)
 Best Music Director :Devullu(2000)
 Best Male Playback Singer : Orey Rikshaw (1995) - turned down
 Best Male Playback Singer :Sri Ramulayya (1998)
 Best Male Playback Singer:Dandakaranyam (2016)

Other Honors
 Doctorate from Gitam university

Filmography

Composer

Playback singer
 Vande Mataram (1985) (Debut)
 Palnati Pourusham (1994) 
 Orey Rikshaw (1995)
 Money Money (1995)
 Prema Lekha (1996)
 Sri Ramulayya (1998)
 Aahaa..! (1998)
 Aawaragaadu (2000)
 Adavi Chukka (2000)
 Kante Koothurne Kanu (2000)
 Gemeni (2002)
 Jai Bolo Telangana (2011)
 Poru Telangana (2012)
 Biriyani (2013)
 Udyama Simham (2019)
 Ee Ammayi (2022)

Actor
 Ammulu (2003) .... Kishtaiah

Director
 Badmash (2010)

References

External links
 
 Collection of Vandemataram Srinivas Movies
 Vandemataram Srinivas Performing a Program

1966 births
People from Telangana
Living people
20th-century classical composers
21st-century classical composers
Indian film score composers
Indian male playback singers
Filmfare Awards South winners
20th-century Indian musicians
Indian male film score composers
20th-century Indian male singers
20th-century Indian singers
21st-century Indian male singers
21st-century Indian singers